The 2003 World Youth Championships in Athletics was the third edition of the international athletics competition for youth (under-18) athletes organised by the IAAF. It was held in Sherbrooke, Canada from the 9–13 July at the Université de Sherbrooke Stadium.

Results

Boys

Girls

Medals table

References
 results

2003
World Youth Championships in Athletics
Athletics
Sport in Sherbrooke
2003 in Quebec
International track and field competitions hosted by Canada
2003 in youth sport